Shane Johnson (born February 29, 1976) is an American actor with numerous credits in both television and film. He is noted for playing Scott in Black Cadillac and Cooper Saxe in Power. He has also appeared as Will Cooper in two episodes of the 2008 TNT show Raising the Bar.

Early life 
He graduated from Ephrata High School (WA) in 1994 and later graduated from Whitman College in 1998.

Filmography

Film
Saving Private Ryan (1998, Soldier on the Beach #9)
Love, Lust & Joy (2000, as Barry)
Behind Enemy Lines (2001, extra)
Pumpkin (2002, as Jeremy)
The Big Time (2002, as Timothy Wilkison)
Black Cadillac (2003, as Scott)
Take (2007, as Officer Runion)
The Great Buck Howard (2008, as Las Vegas Producer)
The Hardest Job in the Business (2009, as Craft Service Guy)
Cage Shift (2011, as Kevin the Magician)
Shadow on the Mesa (2013, as Art Dowdy)
Chez Upshaw (2013, as Slade Woodshed)
Hot Guys with Guns (2013, as Himself)
The Possession of Michael King (2014, as Michael King)
Death Everlasting (2014, as Chris Wright)

Television
Undressed (2000, 2 episodes, as Casey)
Freaks and Geeks (2000, 1 episode, as Good-Looking Guy)
Strong Medicine (2000, pilot episode)
ER (2002, 1 episode, as Jason)
Birds of Prey (2002, 1 episode, as Colin)
Bones (2006, 1 episode, as Kyle Richardson)
CSI: NY (2006, 1 episode, as Liam Griffin)
Cold Case (2006, 1 episode, as Sean 'Coop' Cooper)
CSI: Miami (2008, 1 episode, as T.J. Pratt)
Raising the Bar (2008, 2 episodes, as Will Cooper)
Deep Sea Salvage (2009, 6 episodes, as Narrator)
Miami Medical (2010, 1 episode, as Ryan)
Private Practice (2010, 1 episode, as Dave)
The Closer (2011, 1 episode, as Marcus Winslow)
Easy to Assemble (2012, 5 episodes, as Grover Thorsten - webseries)
NCIS (2012, 1 episode, as CIA Agent Stephen Wheeler)
Castle (2012, 1 episode, as Deputy Adam Jones)
Criminal Minds (2012, 1 episode, as Chad Mills)
Power (2014–2020, as Cooper Saxe)
Power Book II: Ghost (2020, as Cooper Saxe)
Chicago P.D. (TV series) (2022 as  Andrew Chaffey)

Video games
The World Ends with You (2007, as Megumi Kitaniji, English version)
Fallout: New Vegas (2010, as multiple voices)
The 3rd Birthday (2010)
Final Fantasy Type-0 HD (2015, as additional voices in English version)
Rise of the Tomb Rider (2015, as multiple voices)
World of Final Fantasy (2016, as additional voices, English version)
Kingdom Hearts III (2019, as additional voices)
Final Fantasy VII Remake (2020, as additional voices)

References

External links
 

1976 births
Living people
American male actors
Whitman College alumni
People from Ephrata, Washington
Place of birth missing (living people)